Achyrospermum is a genus in the family Lamiaceae. It contains 23 species and can be found across Sub-Saharan Africa and Southeast Asia.

Species
Achyrospermum aethiopicum Welw.
Achyrospermum africanum Hook.f. ex Baker
Achyrospermum axillare E.A.Bruce
Achyrospermum carvalhoi Gürke
Achyrospermum ciliatum Gürke
Achyrospermum cryptanthum Baker
Achyrospermum dasytrichum Perkins
Achyrospermum densiflorum Blume
Achyrospermum erythobotrys Perkins
Achyrospermum fruticosum Benth.
Achyrospermum laterale Baker
Achyrospermum micranthum Perkins
Achyrospermum mildbraedii Perkins
Achyrospermum oblongifolium Baker
Achyrospermum parviflorum S.Moore
Achyrospermum purpureum Phillipson
Achyrospermum scandens Polhill
Achyrospermum schimperi (Hochst. ex Briq.) Perkins
Achyrospermum schlechteri Gürke
Achyrospermum seychellarum Baker
Achyrospermum tisserantii Letouzey
Achyrospermum urens Baker
Achyrospermum wallichianum (Benth.) Benth. ex Hook.f.

References

Lamiaceae genera
Lamiaceae